Henri Joseph Eugène Gouraud (17 November 1867 – 16 September 1946) was a French general, best known for his leadership of the French Fourth Army at the end of the First World War. Following this, he became the first High Commissioner of the Levant (1919–1922) then Military governor of Paris (1923–1937).

Early life 
Henri Gouraud was born on Rue de Grenelle in the 7th arrondissement of Paris to Doctor Xavier Gouraud and Marie Portal, the first of six children. The Gouraud family originally came from Vendée, but had left during the French Revolution for Angers, then Paris.
Gouraud was educated at home and at the Collège Stanislas de Paris. His decision for a military career was, like many Frenchmen of his generation, motivated by the French defeat in the Franco-Prussian War (1870–1871).

Gouraud entered the Saint Cyr Military Academy in 1888 as part of the "Grand Triomphe" promotion, a well-chosen name as it included sixty future generals. He graduated in 1890 and joined the Troupes de marine. He expected to be posted overseas as the Troupes de marine served in the French colonial empire, but his father objected because he feared that the marines would be a bad influence on his son. Gouraud respected his father's wish and was instead posted to the 21st Foot Chasseur Regiment at Montbéliard.

Africa 
Henri Gouraud was assigned in 1894 to French Sudan. He developed a reputation as an effective if lucky commander. In 1898, he was ordered to head one of a number of units fighting Samori, the resistance leader who had been fighting the French for more than a decade. Driven into the highlands south of Niger River valley by a series of previous defeats, Samori's forces were defeated within the year. On 29 September 1898, Gouraud's unit stumbled upon Samori's encampment and captured him. More importantly, it marked the end of the last large state opposing French colonialism in the West.

The capture of Samori made Henri Gouraud a celebrated figure in France, at the same time as nationalists were recovering from the setback against the British at Fashoda. The young captain was feted in the highest political circles of Paris, where he was introduced to powerful businessmen and politicians with interests in the colonial project. Among them were Auguste d'Arenberg and Eugène Étienne, future founders of what was called the "parti colonial". Thanks to the patronage of the "parti colonial", Henri Gouraud pursued a career across French Africa for the next fifteen years, with postings in Niger, Chad and Mauritania. In 1907, he was promoted to colonel and commissaire du Gouvernement général of Mauritania, where he led a campaign against Bedouin tribes who threatened transport between the colonies of Morocco and French West Africa.

In 1911, after attending the centre des Hautes études militaires in France, colonel Gouraud was stationed in Morocco, where he was promoted to général de brigade, serving under Lyautey. He was placed in command of the Fez military region, and from 1914 to 1915 in command of all French colonial troops in western Morocco.

World War I 
In mid-1915 he served as commander of the French Expeditionary Corps that was committed to the Dardanelles campaign. He was wounded on 30 June, and subsequently lost his right arm. From December 1915 to December 1916 and from June 1917 until the end of the war he commanded the Fourth Army on the Western Front, where he gained distinction for his use of elastic defense during the Second Battle of the Marne. On 22 November 1918, he entered the city of Strasbourg, overthrowing the Soviet government that had been proclaimed there on 11 November 1918.

French Mandate of Syria and Lebanon 

After the war, Gouraud served from 1919 to 1922 as representative of the French Government in the Middle East and commander of the French Army of the Levant. As commander of French forces during Franco-Turkish war, he presided over the creation of the French Mandates in Syria and Lebanon. Following the implementation of the 1916 Sykes-Picot Agreement, which divided the occupied remnants of the Ottoman Empire between France and Britain, Gouraud was commander of forces sent to enforce the French division of the Levant.

Between 20 January and 10 February 1920, Gouraud's troops were moved north to support forces in the Franco-Turkish War. Gouraud directed the suppression of a rising of Turkish National Forces at the Battle of Marash which led to the withdrawal of French troops back to Syria.

There, Gouraud's ongoing attempt to control King Faisal came to a head. Gouraud led French forces which crushed King Faisal's short-lived monarchy at the Battle of Maysalun on 23 July 1920, occupied Damascus, defeated the forces of the Syrian Revolution and established the French Mandate of Syria. These territories were reorganised a number of times by Gouraud's decrees, the most famous being the creation of the State of Greater Lebanon on 1 September 1920. Gouraud became the French High Commissioner in Syria and Lebanon, effective head of the colonial government there.

He is remembered in the Levant primarily for this role, and for an apocryphal anecdote. Following the Battle of Maysalun, Gouraud allegedly went to the Tomb of Saladin, kicked it, and said: Awake, Saladin. We have returned. My presence here consecrates the victory of the Cross over the Crescent." The quote is sometimes attributed to Mariano Goybet instead of Gouraud.

Gouraud's administration in Syria borrowed much from his time as a young man working under Lyautey in Morocco, where colonial policy focused on control of the country through manipulation of tribes, Sufis, and the rural Berber populations. In Syria, this took the form of separate administrations for Druze and Alawite communities, with the aim of dividing their interests from those of urban nationalists.

Particularly unpopular following the French taking of Damascus, the folk hero Adham Khanjar of Southern Lebanon staged a failed attempt on Gouraud's life on 23 June 1921.

Later years 

In 1923, he returned to France, where he was the Military Governor of Paris from 1923 to 1937. He also served on the Supreme Allied War Council from 1927 until his retirement in 1937. General Gouraud died in Paris in 1946.

Decorations 
Légion d'honneur
Knight (18 October 1898)
Officer (31 May 1904)
Commander (11 July 1909)
Grand Officer (10 August 1914)
Grand Cross (28 December 1918)
Médaille militaire (10 July 1915)
Honorary Knight Grand Cross of the Order of St Michael and St George (United Kingdom, 27 August 1915)
Croix de guerre 1914–1918
Médaille Interalliée de la Victoire
Médaille commémorative de la guerre 1914–1918
Médaille commémorative de Syrie-Cilicie
Médaille Coloniale with "Sénégal et Soudan" "Maroc" "Mauritanie et Adrar" bars
Grand Cordon of the Order of Saints Maurice and Lazarus (Italy)
Commander of the Nicham El-Anouar (Tunisia)
Commander of the Nichan Iftikhar (Tunisia)
Distinguished Service Medal (USA)
Order of the White Lion (Czechoslovakia)
Order of Karađorđe's Star with swords (Serbia)

Published works 
La Pacification de Mauritanie. Journal des marches et opérations de la colonne de l'Adrar, 1910; Souvenirs d'un Africain, Au Soudan, 1939; Zinder-Tchad. Souvenirs d'un Africain, 1944; Mauritanie-Adrar, 1945; Au Maroc, 1946

Legacy 

Paris has a Place du Général-Gouraud in the 7th arrondissement.
A commemorative statue to Général Gouraud stands in a garden next to Les Invalides.
A massive cedar tree near the town of Ifrane in the Atlas Mountains of Morocco was named for the General; the Gouraud Cedar is considered to be over 800 years old, and was "discovered" by Gouraud's troops during the French campaign against anti-colonial resistance on the Timahdite Plateau in the years 1917–19. Moreover, the Cèdre Gouraud Forest in the Middle Atlas Mountain Range is named for Gouraud; this forest is one of the few remaining habitats of the endangered Barbary macaque.
Rue Gouraud in the Achrafieh district of Beirut is named for the General.

Notes

References 

 This article incorporates translations of the French language Wikipedia articles :fr:Henri Joseph Eugène Gouraud and :fr:Mandat français en Syrie.
Le général Gouraud durant la Grande Guerre
Biographie de Henri Joseph Eugène Gouraud

On his time in the Levant 
Philippe Gouraud. Le general Henri Gouraud au Liban et en Syrie (1919–1923) (Comprendre le Moyen-Orient). L'Harmattan (1993). 
Elizabeth Thompson. Colonial Citizens: Republican Rights, Paternal Privilege, and Gender in French Syria and Lebanon. Columbia University Press, (2000)

External links

 

1867 births
1946 deaths
Politicians from Paris
French military personnel of World War I
French generals
People of French West Africa
People of French Equatorial Africa
French colonial governors of Mauritania
Colonial Governors of French Niger
French colonial governors and administrators
High Commissioners of the Levant
Military governors of Paris
Members of the Académie des Inscriptions et Belles-Lettres
French military personnel of the Franco-Turkish War
People of the Franco-Syrian War
Collège Stanislas de Paris alumni
Foreign recipients of the Distinguished Service Medal (United States)
Recipients of the Order of the White Lion
Recipients of the Croix de Guerre 1914–1918 (France)
Grand Croix of the Légion d'honneur
Recipients of the Ordre du Nichan El-Anouar
Honorary Knights Grand Cross of the Order of St Michael and St George
Recipients of the Distinguished Service Medal (US Army)
French amputees
Military personnel from Paris